Betty Mitchell may refer to:

Betty Mitchell (speed skater) (born 1928), Canadian speed skater
Betty Mitchell (theatre director) (1896–1976), American-born Canadian theatre director and educator
Betty Lou Mitchell (born 1937), American politician
Bessie Guthrie (1905–1977), Australian designer, publisher, feminist and activist born Bessie Jean Thompson Mitchell